Downhill is a 1927 British silent drama film directed by Alfred Hitchcock, starring Ivor Novello, Robin Irvine and Isabel Jeans, and based on the play Down Hill by Novello and Constance Collier. The film was produced by Gainsborough Pictures at their Islington studios. Downhill was Hitchcock's fourth film as director, but the fifth to be released. Its American alternative title was When Boys Leave Home.

Plot 
At an expensive English boarding school for boys, Roddy Berwick is school captain and star rugby player. He and his best friend Tim Wakeley start seeing a shopgirl, Mabel, who tells the headmaster that she is pregnant and that Roddy is the father. However, Tim is the father, and he cannot afford to be expelled because he needs to win a scholarship to attend the University of Oxford. Promising Tim that he will never reveal the truth, Roddy accepts expulsion.

Returning to his parents’ home, Roddy finds that his father Sir Thomas Berwick believes him guilty of the false accusation. Roddy leaves home and finds work as an actor at a theatre, then marries lead actress Julia Fotheringale after inheriting £30,000 from a relation. Julia secretly continues an affair with her leading man Archie and discards Roddy after his inheritance is exhausted. He becomes a taxi dancer (implying that he is also a gigolo) in a Paris dance hall but soon quits, disgusted that he has been romancing older women for money.

Roddy ends up alone and delirious in a shabby room in Marseilles. Some sailors take pity on him and ship him back home, possibly hoping for a reward. Roddy's father has learned the truth about the shopgirl's false accusation during his son's absence and joyfully welcomes him back. Roddy resumes his previous life.

Cast
 Ivor Novello as Roddy Berwick
 Ben Webster as Dr. Dawson
 Norman McKinnel as Sir Thomas Berwick
 Robin Irvine as Tim Wakeley
 Jerrold Robertshaw as Reverend Henry Wakeley
 Sybil Rhoda as Sybil Wakely
 Annette Benson as Mabel
 Lilian Braithwaite as Lady Berwick
 Isabel Jeans as Julia Fotheringale
 Ian Hunter as Archie
 Hannah Jones as The Dressmaker
 Barbara Gott as Madame Michet
 Violet Farebrother as The Poet
 Alf Goddard as The Swede
 J. Nelson as Hibbert

Production
The film is based on the play Down Hill, which was written by its star Ivor Novello and Constance Collier under the combined alias David L'Estrange.

The stage performance had a short run in the West End and longer in the provinces. In the play, Novello thrilled his female fans by washing his bare legs in a scene following a rugby match. An appreciative James Agate, drama critic for the London Sunday Times, wrote: "The scent of good honest soap crosses the footlights." Alfred Hitchcock included a similar scene of Novello for the film, in which he is shown naked from the waist up.

Hitchcock used a variety of screen techniques with a minimum of title cards, preferring instead to allow the film's visual narrative tell the story. The scene after Roddy leaves home opens with the title card "The world of make-believe," but everything else in the scene is conveyed visually. A closeup of Roddy in a tuxedo pulls back to show that he is waiting on a table at a restaurant, where he pockets a woman's cigarette case. The camera then follows him to reveal that he is actually playing a waiter on stage in a theatre. Hitchcock also incorporated shots of a descending escalator at Maida Vale tube station as a visual metaphor for Roddy's downhill descent. Although in a later interview with Francois Truffaut, Hitchcock called that scene "a naive touch that I wouldn't do today," he also incorporated a later scene of Roddy descending in an elevator for a similar effect. Hitchcock played with shadow and light in much the same way as did directors of German expressionist films of the time, especially F.W. Murnau, for whom Hitchcock had worked as an assistant director. In the Parisian dance-hall scene, Roddy tells his life story to an apparently sympathetic older woman, but as the morning light comes through the windows, he is repelled by the tawdry, decadent scene and the woman's masculine-looking face. Hitchcock experimented with dream sequences by sometimes shooting them in superimpositions, but broke with the common use of blurred images to indicate a hallucinatory scene by "[embodying] the dream in the reality, in solid, unblurred images." While delirious on the ship, Roddy envisions his father approaching him in a manner reminiscent of Murnau's vampire in Nosferatu, and when he returns to London, Roddy envisions a policeman's face as his father's.

Preservation and home video status
A fully tinted restoration of Downhill was completed in 2012 as part of the BFI's £2 million Save the Hitchcock 9 project to restore all of Hitchcock's surviving silent films.

As with Hitchcock's other British films, all of which are copyrighted worldwide, Downhill has been heavily bootlegged on home video. However, various licensed, restored releases have appeared on DVD, Blu-ray and video on demand from Network Distributing in the UK, The Criterion Collection in the U.S., and many others.

At the end of 2022, Downhill entered the public domain in the United States but only in its non-restored, scoreless form. It will remain copyrighted in the rest of the world until the end of 2050.

References

External links
 
 
 
 Alfred Hitchcock Collectors’ Guide: Downhill at Brenton Film

1927 films
Films directed by Alfred Hitchcock
British black-and-white films
1927 drama films
British silent feature films
British drama films
Films set in London
Films set in England
Films set in France
Gainsborough Pictures films
British films based on plays
1920s British films
Silent drama films
1920s English-language films